The 2021 Cleveland City Council election was held on November 2, 2021. The primary elections were held on September 14, 2021. All 17 seats on Cleveland City Council were up for election for four-year terms. Elections in Cleveland are officially nonpartisan, with the top two candidates from the primary election advancing to the general election, regardless of party.

Incumbent status

Two council members, Basheer Jones of Ward 7 and Council President Kevin Kelley of Ward 13, retired to run unsuccessfully for Mayor of Cleveland in the concurrent mayoral election.

East Side

Ward 1
Councilman Joe Jones successfully ran for reelection.

Ward 2
Councilman Kevin Bishop successfully ran for reelection.

Ward 3
Councilman Kerry McCormack successfully ran for reelection.

Ward 4

Councilwoman Marion Anita Gardner was appointed by Cuyahoga County Probate Judge Anthony Russo to fill the seat of indicted Councilman Ken Johnson. Gardner chose not to run for election to a full term. Although he was legally barred from holding office, Johnson ran a campaign to regain his seat, though he would be eliminated in the primary.

Ward 4 would elect Democratic precinct committeewoman Deborah Gray, the twin sister of councilwoman Delores Gray, who unsuccessfully ran for election to a full term in Ward 5.

Ward 5
Councilwoman Delores Gray ran unsuccessfully for a full term after being appointed to fill the seat of retiring councilwoman Phyllis Cleveland. Gray would be unseated by Richard A. Starr, the director of the Boys and Girls Clubs of Cleveland.

Ward 6
Councilman Blaine Griffin ran unopposed.

Ward 7
Incumbent Councilman Basheer Jones gave up his seat to run unsuccessfully for Mayor of Cleveland in the concurrent mayoral election. Jones would be succeeded by State Representative Stephanie Howse.

Ward 8
Councilman Michael Polensek successfully ran for reelection.

Ward 9
Councilman Kevin Conwell ran unopposed.

Ward 10
Councilman Anthony Hairston ran unopposed.

West Side

Ward 11
Councilman Brian Mooney successfully won election to a full term.

Ward 12
Councilman Anthony Brancatelli was unseated by lawyer Rebecca Maurer. Brancatelli was the only elected Councilmember to lose reelection.

Ward 13
City Council President Kevin Kelley gave up his seat to run unsuccessfully for Mayor of Cleveland in the concurrent mayoral election. Voters replaced Kelley with community organizer and housing advocate Kris Harsh.

Ward 14
Councilwoman Jasmine Santana successfully ran for reelection.

Ward 15
Councilwoman Jenny Spencer successfully won election to a full term.

Ward 16
Councilman Brian Kazy ran unopposed.

Ward 17
Councilman Charles J. Slife successfully won election to a full term.

Notes

References

2020s in Cleveland
Cleveland City Council election
Cleveland City Council
Cleveland 2011
Government of Cleveland
Non-partisan elections
Local elections in Ohio